Hudi Log is a small settlement in the Municipality of Miren-Kostanjevica in the Littoral region of Slovenia, close to the border with Italy.

References

External links
Hudi Log on Geopedia

Populated places in the Municipality of Miren-Kostanjevica